Sasajiscymnus tsugae, formerly Pseudoscymnus tsugae, is a species of insect in the family Coccinellidae. It feeds on the hemlock woolly adelgid.

History
The species is a biological control method for the hemlock woolly adelgid in North America.  S. tsugae is a black lady beetle that is relatively host-specific, feeding only on three known aldegid species, including HWA.  This beetle was discovered in 1992 while feeding on hemlock woolly adelgid in its natural range of Japan.  Since 1995, the Pennsylvania Department of Conservation and Natural Resources's Bureau of Forestry has released hundreds of thousands of adult S. tsugae beetles into affected hemlock forests of the eastern United States to determine its effectiveness at controlling the spread of the adelgid. From 1995 to 1997, experiments in Connecticut and Virginia found that releasing adult Sasajiscymnus tsugae beetles into infested hemlock stands resulted in a 47 to 88% reduction in adelgid densities within 5 months of introduction. The beetle's lifecycle is in parallel to the lifecycle of the hemlock woolly adelgid. Both lay eggs in the spring and hatching occurs nearly simultaneously. When hatched, S. tsugae larvae are highly mobile and feed on hemlock woolly adelgid eggs and larvae. Each S. tsugae larva can effectively consume about 500 adelgid eggs or nearly 100 developing adelgid nymphs.

Description
Adult S. tsugae are oval-shaped and are about 1.7 mm long by 1.1 mm wide. They are entirely black and are pubescent on the dorsal surface. Eggs are reddish-orange in color, oval-shaped, and 0.48 mm long by 0.25 mm wide inside an opalescent sheath or chorion. The eggs are usually laid singly or in small groups in crevices in the bark and in the scales of buds. The larvae grow from about 1.1 mm to 2.7 mm during their four instars of development. They change color from reddish-brown to gray as they mature. The pupa is about 1.9 mm long and 1.1 mm wide and is reddish-brown color. The adults emerge as a light golden brown color before darkening to jet black after about one day.

References 

Coccinellidae